Buttrick White & Burtis (also known as BWB) was an architecture firm established in New York City in 1981 by the architects Harold Buttrick, Samuel G. White, and Theodore A. Burtis III. The firm remained active until 2002. Harold Buttrick left the firm in 1998 to form Murphy Burnham & Buttrick Architects (MBB Architects). The architect Jean P. Phifer was a partner of the firm until 1996, after which she served as President of the Art Commission of the City of New York from 1998 to 2003. The architect Michael Dwyer was associated with the firm from 1981 to 1996. The architect and educator William W. Braham was associated with the firm from 1983 to 1989. In 2002, Buttrick White & Burtis merged with Platt Byard Dovell to become Platt Byard Dovell White (PBDW Architects).

Architectural practice

Buttrick White & Burtis's work was eclectic. Writing in 1985 in New York Magazine, the architectural historian Carter Wiseman contrasted the firm's conservative renovation work at the traditional, oak-paneled Harvard Club of New York with their more avant-garde designs for the stores of the then-hip Tower Records chain, adding that the  chain's downtown venue was "the most successful such enterprise in America." 

BWB was also known for artful renovations and additions to architectural landmarks, such as the Grand Army Plaza, in Manhattan, restored in 1990; Casa Italiana, Columbia University, completed in 1996; and the Brooklyn College library, completed in 2002. 

The firm's largest project, a fifteen-story, postmodern building in Manhattan, built for the Saint Thomas Choir School, was completed in 1987, and dedicated in January 1988 by the Most Rev. and Rt. Hon. Robert Runcie, Archbishop of Canterbury.

BWB occasionally designed new work in a traditional idiom; in a 1995 survey by The New York Times of the then-emerging New Classical school of architecture, the reporter Patricia Leigh Brown noted that, "Michael Dwyer...an architect at Buttrick White & Burtis...has recently completed a classical-style yacht and an $8.95 million town house on the Upper East Side and is renovating Rudolph Nureyev's former apartment in the Dakota."

The architects associated with Buttrick White & Burtis were prolific authors, most notably Samuel G. White, a great-grandson of the architect Stanford White, who between 1998 and 2008 co-authored a trilogy of the work of Stanford White's firm, McKim, Mead & White. In 2015, the trilogy's authors were given an Arthur Ross Award by the Institute of Classical Architecture and Art.

Principal architectural works

 Ships Chandlery, 170 John Street, New York City (restoration & addition of sixth floor, completed 1982).
 Tower Records, Broadway at 4th St., New York City (completed 1983).
 Tower Records, Broadway at West 66th St., New York City (completed 1984).
 Tower Records, Washington DC (completed 1985).
 Tower Records, Torrance, CA (completed 1986). 
 Tower Records, Piccadilly Circus, London, UK (completed 1986). 
 Saint Thomas Choir School, 202 West 58th St., New York City (completed 1987).
 Grand Army Plaza, Manhattan, New York City (restoration completed 1990).
 Ballplayers House, Central Park, New York City (completed 1990).
 Annex Building, Chapin School, New York City (completed 1990).
 Classical Townhouse, 14 East 81st Street, New York City (completed 1991).
 Dana Discovery Center, Central Park, New York City (completed 1993).
 William Sidney Mount House, Stony Brook, NY (restored 1993).
 Bonnie Dune, Residence, Southampton, NY (restored 1993)—with Jed Johnson Associates (interior decoration).
 Otto H. Kahn House (Convent of the Sacred Heart), Fifth Avenue at 91st Street, New York City (restored 1994).
 Casa Italiana, Columbia University, New York City (restoration & new east facade, completed 1996)—with Italo Rota (associate architect).
 Frick Art Reference Library, The Frick Collection, Fifth Avenue, New York City (alterations completed 1996)—with Shepley Bulfinch (associate architect).
 Walsh Library, Fordham University, Bronx, NY (completed 1996)—with Shepley Bulfinch (associate architect).
 Siegel Student Center, Sarah Lawrence College, Bronxville, NY (restoration & addition, completed 1998).
 Middle School Building, Trinity School, New York City (completed 1998).
 Second Street Child Care Center, 333 Second St., Brooklyn, New York (completed 1999).
 Marymount School of New York, 2 East 82nd Street, New York City (alterations completed 2001).
 Library, Brooklyn College, Brooklyn, NY (restoration & addition, completed 2002)—with Shepley Bulfinch (associate architect).

Gallery

Written works

Among the written works of architects who at one time or another were associates or partners at Buttrick White & Burtis are the following:

 William W. Braham. Modern Color/Modern Architecture: Amédée Ozenfant and the Genealogy of Color in Modern Architecture (London: Ashgate, 2002). 
 Michael Dwyer, ed., with preface by Mark Rockefeller. Great Houses of the Hudson River (Boston, MA: Little, Brown and Company, 2001).
 Michael Dwyer, with a foreword by Mario Buatta. Carolands (Redwood City, CA: San Mateo County Historical Association, 2006).
 Jean Parker Phifer. Public Art New York (New York: W.W. Norton & Co., 2009).
 Samuel G. White. The Houses of McKim, Mead & White (New York: Rizzoli, 1998).
 Samuel G. White and Elizabeth White. McKim, Mead & White: The Masterworks (New York: Rizzoli, 2003).
 Samuel G. White and Elizabeth White. Stanford White Architect (New York: Rizzoli, 2008).
 Samuel G. White. Nice House (New York: The Monacelli Press, 2010).
 Samuel G. White. Stanford White in Detail (New York: The Monacelli Press, 2020).

External links

Website of PBDW Architects
Website of MBB Architects
Website of Michael Dwyer Architect

References

Architects from New York City
Defunct architecture firms based in New York City
Preservationist architects
Postmodern architects
20th-century American architects
Central Park
Design companies established in 1981
1981 establishments in New York City
Design companies disestablished in 2002
2002 disestablishments in New York (state)
2002 mergers and acquisitions
New Classical architects